St. Joseph Parish is designated for Polish immigrants in Central Falls, Rhode Island, United States.

History
Founded in 1905, it is one of the Polish-American Roman Catholic parishes in New England in the Diocese of Providence. The current building was designed in 1915 by Providence architect John F. O'Malley in the Gothic Revival style.

See also
 Catholic Church in the United States
 Catholic parish church
 Pastoral care
 Index of Catholic Church articles
 The Haitian Project

References

Bibliography 
 
 
 
 The Official Catholic Directory in USA

External links 
 Official site of the Holy See
 St. Joseph - Diocesan information
 St. Joseph - ParishesOnline.com
 St. Joseph Parish History - Central Falls RI
 Parish history
 St. Joseph – Discovermass.com

Churches in the Roman Catholic Diocese of Providence
Polish-American culture in Rhode Island
Polish-American Roman Catholic parishes in New England
Churches in Providence County, Rhode Island
Central Falls, Rhode Island